Kakdwip Assembly constituency is a Legislative Assembly constituency of South 24 Parganas district in the Indian State of West Bengal.

Overview
As per order of the Delimitation Commission in respect of the Delimitation of constituencies in the West Bengal, Kakdwip Assembly constituency is composed of the following:
 Kakdwip community development block
 Budhakhali and Narayanpur gram panchayats of Namkhana community development block

Kakdwip Assembly constituency is a part of No. 20 Mathurapur (Lok Sabha constituency).

Members of Legislative Assembly

Election results

2021

2011

Legislative Assembly Elections 1977-2006
In 2006, Ashok Giri of CPI(M) won the Kakdwip Assembly constituency defeating Manturam Pakhira of AITC. Manturam Pakhira of AITC won in 2001 defeating Ashok Giri of CPI(M). In 1996, Ashok Giri of CPI(M) defeated Manturam Pakhira of INC. Hrishikesh Maity of CPI(M) won in 1991, 1987, 1982 and 1977 defeating Gourishankar Bhattacharya of INC in 1991 and 1987, and Basudev Sautya of INC in 1982 and 1977.

Legislative Assembly Elections 1957-1972
Basudeb Sautya of INC won in 1972. Hrishikesh Maity of CPI(M) won in 1971. Hansadhwaj Dhara of INC won in 1969 and 1967. Maya Banejee of INC won in 1962 and 1957. The seat did not exist prior to that.

References

Notes

Citations

Assembly constituencies of West Bengal
Politics of South 24 Parganas district